The 2010–11 Swiss Cup was the 86th season of Switzerland's annual football cup competition. It began on 18 September 2010 with the first games of Round 1 and ended on 29 May 2011 with the Final. The winners, FC Sion, claimed their 12th cup overall and will qualify for the play-off round of the UEFA Europa League.

Participating clubs
All ten Super League teams and fifteen Challenge League clubs (FC Vaduz are from Liechtenstein and thus play in the 2010–11 Liechtenstein Cup) entered this year's competition, as well as 13 teams from 1. Liga and 26 teams from lower leagues. Teams from 1. Liga and below had to qualify through separate qualifying rounds within their leagues.

Teams in bold are still active in the competition.

Round 1
Teams from Super League and Challenge League were seeded in this round. In a match, the home advantage was granted to the team from the lower league, if applicable.

The games were played on 18, 19 and 22 September 2010.

| colspan="3" style="background:#9cc;"|18 September 2010

|-
| colspan="3" style="background:#9cc;"|19 September 2010

|-
| colspan="3" style="background:#9cc;"|22 September 2010

|}

Round 2
The winners of Round 1 played in this round. Teams from Super League were seeded, the home advantage was granted to the team from the lower league, if applicable.

The games were played on 15, 16 and 17 October 2010.

| colspan="3" style="background:#9cc;"|15 October 2010

|-
| colspan="3" style="background:#9cc;"|16 October 2010

|-
| colspan="3" style="background:#9cc;"|17 October 2010

|}

Round 3
The winners of Round 2 played in this round, the home advantage was granted to the team from the lower league, if applicable.

The games were played on 20–21 November 2010.

| colspan="3" style="background:#9cc;"|20 November 2010

|-
| colspan="3" style="background:#9cc;"|21 November 2010

|}

Quarter-finals
The winners of Round 3 played in this round. The games were played on 2 and 3 March 2011.

Semi-finals
The winners of the quarter-finals played this round. The games were played on 25 and 28 April 2011.

Final
The final was played on 29 May 2011 between the two semi-final winners and took place at St. Jakob-Park in Basel.

External links
 Official site

References

Swiss Cup seasons
Swiss Cup
Swiss Cup